Nashi, translated as Ours, was a political party in Ukraine registered February 2015. Since 2018, the party has been led by Yevheniy Murayev. On 14 June 2022 the party was banned by a court order.

History
In September 2018, former member of For Life Yevheniy Murayev reconstituted the party under its current name Nashi.

In a November 2018 "RATING" opinion poll the party scored 4.9%.

On 10 January 2019, the party elected party leader Murayev as their candidate in the 2019 Ukrainian presidential election. On 7 March 2019, Muraev pulled out of the election favor of Oleksandr Vilkul. He also announced that Vilkul's party Opposition Bloc — Party for Peace and Development and Nashi would soon merge. Indeed, in the 2019 Ukrainian parliamentary election the party joined a united party list with the political parties of Opposition Bloc — Party for Peace and Development, Revival and Trust Deeds. In this election this list won six single-seat constituencies and its nationwide list won 3.23% of the votes meaning it did not overcome the 5% election barrier.

In 2020, the political party participated in local elections as part of regional electoral blocs (Kernes Bloc — Successful Kharkiv, Trust Deeds, etc.). Operating under its own name the party won 6 seats. In the Yuzhnenskoy city territorial community, the political party took the majority.

In the fall of 2021, Yevgeny Muraev presented the New Country Formula on the Nash party TV channel.

In January 2022, the British government accused Russia of seeking to supplant Ukraine's government via military force, and replace it with a pro-Russian administration possibly led by Murayev. British Foreign Minister Liz Truss wrote on Twitter that the UK "will not tolerate Kremlin plot to install pro-Russian leadership in Ukraine." Murayev denied any such plan. Yevhen Murayev rejected the statement since he is under Russian sanctions. Russia dismissed the accusation as "misinformation". The Russian Foreign Ministry said the British accusation was "evidence that it is the NATO countries, led by the Anglo-Saxons, that are escalating tensions around Ukraine." Volodymyr Fesenko, a Ukrainian political analyst, wrote that "Murayev, for all his pro-Russianness, is not a figure who is very close to the Kremlin, especially compared to (Viktor) Medvedchuk."

During the Russian military invasion of Ukraine, a number of functionaries of the Nashi party cooperated with the Russian troops and headed the military-civilian administrations in the territories occupied by the Russians.

On 20 March 2022 Nashi was one of several political parties suspended by the National Security and Defense Council of Ukraine during the 2022 Russian invasion of Ukraine, along with Derzhava, Left Opposition, Opposition Bloc, Opposition Platform — For Life, Party of Shariy, Progressive Socialist Party of Ukraine, Socialist Party of Ukraine, Union of Leftists, and the Volodymyr Saldo Block.

On 14 June 2022 the Eighth Administrative Court of Appeal banned Nashi. The property of the party and all its branches were transferred to the state. (Of all the parties suspended on 20 March 2022 only the Progressive Socialist Party of Ukraine and Opposition Platform — For Life actively opposed its banning.)

Ideology 
The party declares adherence to the neutral and non-bloc status of Ukraine; respect for history, concern for the development of culture and native language; country's reindustrialization policy; broad decentralization and cultural autonomy of all regions of Ukraine.

According to Ukrainian journalists and political scientists, Nashi is one of the many pro-Russian parties (Opposition Bloc, Opposition Platform – For Life, etc.) formed from the wreckage of the now-defunct Party of Regions.

Some see the star motif in the party's logo as redolent of the Soviet (or Kremlin's) red star.

The party has a pro-Russian stance.

Leadership 
The party is headed by deputies of VII and VIII convocations. Yevheniy Murayev and Olexander Dolzhenkov, which were previously part of the party "OPZZH" and "Party of Regions". It was announced the creation of a youth organization led by Dmitry Safonov.

See also
 Nashi (1990s nationalist group)
 Nashi (youth movement)

Notes

References

External links
Official website
Facebook
Instagram
Twitter
VK

2018 establishments in Ukraine
2022 disestablishments in Ukraine
Banned political parties in Ukraine
Conservative parties in Ukraine
Defunct conservative parties
Eurasianism
Eurosceptic parties in Ukraine
Political parties established in 2018
Political parties disestablished in 2022
Regionalist parties in Ukraine
Russian political parties in Ukraine
Social conservative parties